The Bar Harbor Historical Society is the principal historical society of Bar Harbor, Maine and Mount Desert Island.  The society's museum is located in the La Rochelle mansion at 127 West Street in Bar Harbor, having moved from 33 Ledgelawn Avenue in early 2019. The 41-room property was built in 1902 for George Bowdoin (1833–1913).

Gallery

References

External links
 Bar Harbor Historical Society

Museums in Hancock County, Maine
Buildings and structures in Bar Harbor, Maine